Henry Kemble Southwell  (20 November 1860 – 9 March 1937) was the third Bishop of Lewes from 1920 until 1926.

Biography 
Born in 1860, and educated at Charterhouse and Magdalen College, Oxford, he held curacies at Ellesmere, Shropshire, St Clement's in Bournemouth and St Nicolas in Guildford; then incumbencies at Chetton, Shropshire and Bodmin before becoming a Canon Residentiary of Chichester Cathedral.

He was appointed chaplain to the 2nd Volunteer Battalion, Royal Sussex Regiment, in 1904 and served throughout the First World War in the Army Chaplains' Department. He was appointed Assistant Chaplain-General, and became a Companion of the Order of St Michael and St George in the 1916 Birthday Honours for services in the field.

Already Archdeacon of Lewes and a Canon Residentiary of Chichester Cathedral since 1911, he was also appointed to the episcopate in 1920 and held the suffragan See of Lewes office for six years. He resigned his Archdeaconry in 1923, his See in 1926, and his canonry in 1935. At his death, he was Canon Precentor of Chichester Cathedral and Provost of Lancing College, and had been an Assistant Bishop of Chichester since 1930; he died on 9 March 1937 in Chichester, aged 76, his son having predeceased him during the First World War. A fund initiated after his death yielded enough contributions to provide a memorial, which can be seen at St Cuthman Whitehawk in Brighton.

Southwell was a very prominent Freemason, initiated in the Apollo University Lodge, Oxford, in 1880. He was appointed as Grand Chaplain of the United Grand Lodge of England in 1913.

References

1860 births
People educated at Charterhouse School
Alumni of Magdalen College, Oxford
20th-century Church of England bishops
Bishops of Lewes
Archdeacons of Lewes
1937 deaths
Companions of the Order of St Michael and St George